Maarrich  is an Indian Hindi-language crime-thriller film written and directed by Dhruv Lather. Produced by Tusshar Kapoor, Narendra Hirawat and Shreyans Hirawat under the banner of Tusshar Entertainment House and NH Studioz. It stars Tusshar Kapoor, Anita Hassanandani, Naseeruddin Shah, Rahul Dev and Seerat Kapoor in his film debut.

Cast
 Tusshar Kapoor as Rajiv Dixit
 Anita Hassanandani as Sushmita Dixit
 Naseeruddin Shah as Lobo
 Rahul Dev as Anthony
 Seerat Kapoor as Reena
 Taiyaba Mansuri as Ashram girl
 Dipannita Sharma as Shalini Mehta
 Aakash Dahiya as Mahesh
 Manvir Singh
 Chelsha Gosai as Lisa

Production
The principal photography of the film started in 2021. The film marks the third collaboration between Tusshar Kapoor and Anita Hassanandani after Kucch To Hai and Yeh Dil both released in (2003).

Soundtrack 

The film's music is composed by Amaal Mallik and Vishal Mishra while lyrics were penned by Vishal Mishra, Kaushal Kishore and Rashmi Virag. The first single "Na Boond" was released on 26 November 2022. The second single "Deewana" was released on 1 December 2022. The third single "Jaa Ne Jaa" was released on 6 December 2022.

Marketing and release
The trailer of the film was released on 17 November 2022. Maarrich was released theatrically on 9 December 2022.

Reception

See also

 List of Hindi films of 2022

References

External links
 
 

2020s Hindi-language films